

Awards

FIBA European Champions Cup Finals Top Scorer
 Bruce Flowers ( Squibb Cantù)

References

External links
FIBA European League 1981–82

1981–82 in European basketball
1983–84
1982 in West German sport
1982 in Israeli sport
1981–82 in Italian basketball
International basketball competitions hosted by West Germany